Ricky Graham (born 21 June 1946) is a former Australian rules footballer who played for Geelong in the Victorian Football League (VFL) during the late 1960s.

He also captain-coached Tasmanian Football League (TFL) club New Norfolk. Ricky comes from a famous footballing family with his father Jack and nephew Ben each playing over 200 games in the VFL/AFL.

Mostly a centreman and flanker during his career, Graham played originally with Geelong Districts. He made his debut for Geelong's VFL side in 1965 and appeared in the seniors sporadically over the course of his five-year career. He spent a lot of his time in the reserves and won a Gardiner Medal in 1967. His efforts in the reserves that year earned him selection as 20th man in the Grand Final against Richmond but he finished on the losing side. Graham did however kick one of his four VFL goals in the game, from outside 50, with such long kicking being a feature of his game.

Graham was appointed captain-coach of New Norfolk in 1970 and won the William Leitch Medal two years later. He had the distinction of captaining Tasmania at the 1972 Perth Carnival. From 1973 to 1976 he coached Ulverstone and steered them to the 1976 Tasmanian State Premiership. He finished his coaching career in Queensland with Windsor-Zillmere.

In his retirement from football Graham had a brief stint as a Brisbane Bears board member and became a property developer on the Gold Coast. He is now semi-retired.

References
Holmesby, Russell and Main, Jim (2007). The Encyclopedia of AFL Footballers. 7th ed. Melbourne: Bas Publishing.

External links

1946 births
Australian rules footballers from South Australia
Geelong Football Club players
William Leitch Medal winners
New Norfolk Football Club players
New Norfolk Football Club coaches
Living people
Brisbane Bears administrators
People educated at Adelaide High School